Peraton Inc. is a privately held American national security and technology company formed in 2017, with corporate headquarters in Reston, VA. Its areas of service include space, intelligence, cyber, defense, homeland security, citizen security, and health. The company's applied research organization, Peraton Labs, is headquartered in Basking Ridge, New Jersey.

Peraton was formed in 2017 through the acquisition of Harris Corporation's government IT services division by Veritas Capital.  Peraton purchased Perspecta Inc. in May 2021 for $7.1 billion. Veritas also purchased Northrop Grumman's federal IT division in 2021. In 2021 the company had more than 150 offices across the United States. 

The company plans to move its headquarters from Herndon to Reston Town Center in Reston in 2022. As of 2021, Peraton employed over 5,000 people in the D.C. area and approximately 18,000 employees total worldwide.

Peraton says its name is "a construct of the prefix per, which means thoroughly, and the word imperative, reflecting the importance of its customers' missions".

History

In 2017, the New York-based private-equity firm Veritas Capital acquired the government IT services division of Harris Corporation, and renamed it Peraton.  In 2019, Peraton acquired Solers, Inc.; the terms of the acquisition were not disclosed.  In 2021, Veritas acquired the federal IT and mission support business of Northrop Grumman for $3.4 billion in cash and placed it within the Peraton subsidiary. 

In May of 2021, Perspecta (a 2018 merger of DXC Technology's U.S. public sector spin-off Vencore, Inc., and KeyPoint Government Solutions), was acquired by Veritas for $7.1 billion and placed under Peraton. In 2022, Peraton through its newly acquired subsidiary Perspecta has been awarded a $2.69 billion contract by the U.S. Department of Homeland Security concerning Data Center and Cloud Optimization Support Services.

References

Information technology companies of the United States
American companies established in 2017
Companies based in Fairfax County, Virginia